Qadirbek Qamza (born December 1961) is a Chinese politician of Kazakh ethnicity who is the current vice chairman of the Standing Committee of the People's Congress of Xinjiang Uygur Autonomous Region.

Biography
Qadirbek Qamza was born in Emin County, Xinjiang, in December 1961. He entered the workforce in May 1982, and joined the Chinese Communist Party in December 1986. He worked in the Tacheng Branch of Ili Kazakh Autonomous Prefecture People's Procuratorate before being promoted to assistant magistrate of Toli County in May 1995. He was deputy party secretary of Yumin County in December 1996, and held that office until July 2002, when he was appointed deputy party secretary and magistrate of Shawan County. In January 2005, he became secretary-general of Tacheng Prefecture and was assigned to vice political commissar of the 9th Division of Xinjiang Production and Construction Corps in January 2006. In May 2008, he was made deputy secretary-general of Xinjiang Uyghur Autonomous Region. He was appointed head of the Department of Land and Resources of Xinjiang Uygur Autonomous Region in July 2016, concurrently serving as vice chairman of Xinjiang Uyghur Autonomous Region in January 2018. He also served as head of the Department of Natural Resources of Xinjiang Uygur Autonomous Region from November 2018 to April 2021. In January 2022, he was proposed as vice chairman of the Standing Committee of the People's Congress of Xinjiang Uygur Autonomous Region.

References

1961 births
Living people
People from Emin County
Central Party School of the Chinese Communist Party alumni
Tianjin University alumni
Kazakhs in China
People's Republic of China politicians from Xinjiang
Chinese Communist Party politicians from Xinjiang